Darris Nichols (born May 20, 1986) is an American basketball coach and former player who is currently the head coach at Radford University, a role he has held since 2021.

Playing career

College 
Nichols played college basketball at West Virginia, where he was a four-year letterman who played in 144 games during his four-year career.

Professional 
After going undrafted out of college, Nichols went on to play professionally for Atomerőmű SE, a professional team in Hungary for one season that went 10-1 and won the Hungarian cup before suffering a knee injury that ended his playing career.

Coaching career 
After one season playing professionally overseas, Nichols turned to his former college coach Bob Huggins to begin a coaching career, starting at his alma mater West Virginia as a graduate assistant. He was named an assistant at Northern Kentucky in 2011 and spent two seasons with the team before spending a season each with Wofford and Louisiana Tech. He joined the coaching staff at Florida in 2015 as an assistant on former Louisiana Tech head coach Mike White's staff.

Radford 
Nichols was named the head coach at Radford on April 21, 2021.

Head coaching record

References

External links 
 Radford Highlanders profile
 Florida Gators profile
 Louisiana Tech Bulldogs profile
 West Virginia Mountaineers profile

1986 births
Living people
People from Radford, Virginia
Basketball players from Virginia
Basketball coaches from Virginia
Point guards
Shooting guards
West Virginia Mountaineers men's basketball players
Atomerőmű SE players
West Virginia Mountaineers men's basketball coaches
Northern Kentucky Norse men's basketball coaches
Wofford Terriers men's basketball coaches
Louisiana Tech Bulldogs basketball coaches
Florida Gators men's basketball coaches
Radford Highlanders men's basketball coaches